Rhynchobatus palpebratus, the eyebrow wedgefish, is a species of fish in the Rhinidae family. It is found in coastal waters off northern Australia.

References

External links
 Fishes of Australia : Rhynchobatus palpebratus

eyebrow wedgefish
Marine fish of Northern Australia
Taxa named by Leonard Compagno
Taxa named by Peter R. Last
eyebrow wedgefish